Accordent Technologies was a company that produces software for streaming media creation and management. Its headquarters are located in El Segundo, California and has sales and development offices in Seattle, London, New York City, Atlanta, Dallas and Austin.

Accordent pioneered solutions for creating presentations that synchronize streaming video with PowerPoint slides.

Accordent was listed in Hoovers   as a private company with over 50 employees and 2007 revenues reported to be in excess of $11 million.  The company says that its products are used by more than 1500  clients worldwide, including 150 of the Fortune 500 corporations – such as VeriSign, Marathon Petroleum, Unisys  and JPMorgan Chase – as well as over 450 higher educational and 125 public sector institutions.

The Accordent product line included multimedia management software that enable clients to manage, search and secure online multimedia presentations created with Accordent presentation products, as well as archived versions of content from third-party sources, such as archived versions of videoconferences from TANDBERG and other manufacturers, web conferences and standalone videos.

Accordent was acquired by Polycom in 2011 for $50 million.

Competitors 

The market for online content management and delivery has seen the entry of several competitors to Accordent. Key in this industry vertical are companies like Granicus, which focus on Government webcasts by delivering session notes, meeting agenda, interactive voting, and live interactive webcasts designed to bring government to the public. Other companies that compete against Accordent Technologies are those that utilize the same underlying technologies, such as Sonic Foundry's MediaSite, a webcasting tool that has video plus interactive content similar to Accordent presentations. As the market for webcasting increases, other recognized leaders in the industry, such as Adobe, Echo360, Presentations2Go, Webex and others vie for market share. Newer products that utilize cross-platform capabilities, such as Adobe Flash or Microsoft Silverlight, full-motion interactivity, and enhanced forms of user interaction are being developed.

In the content management system market, derived from the need to organize and store created presentations, long standing players such as Oracle, Microsoft's SharePoint, and The Platform have a large market share. Smaller open source content management systems such as Joomla, Moodle and Angel have increased market presence due to their low cost and accessibility to the education market. In this market, more colleges and universities are increasing their online presence, called a Virtual Campus also known as Learning Management Systems. In this Virtual Campus setting, some notable Learning Management Systems such as Sakai, Blackboard, Desire2Learn all compete directly with Accordent Technologies Media Management System in order to manage classroom content, testing and student coursework.

References 

Software companies based in California
Technology companies established in 2000
Film and video technology
Companies based in El Segundo, California
Defunct companies based in Greater Los Angeles
Defunct software companies of the United States
2000 establishments in California
Software companies established in 2000
American companies established in 2000